Mandyam Veerambudi Srinivasan AM FRS, also known as "Srini", (born 1948) is an Australian bioengineer and neuroscientist who studies visual systems, particularly those of bees and birds.

A faculty member at the University of Queensland, he is a recipient of the Prime Minister's Prize for Science and a fellow of the Australian Academy of Science and the Royal Society (elected 2001).

Early life and education
Srinivasan was born in Poona, India in 1948. His early interests included making transistor radios with his father. His family moved to Calcutta and Delhi before settling in Bangalore, where Srinivasan completed his schooling from the Bishop Cotton Boys' School in 1962. In tertiary education, he earned a number of degrees in the years following:
 1967 - Bachelor's degree in electrical engineering, Bangalore University (5-year degree) 
 1970 - Master's degree in applied electronics and servo mechanisms, Indian Institute of Science, Bangalore, India
 1973 - M.Phil. in engineering and applied science, Yale University
 1977 - PhD in engineering and applied science, Yale University
 1994 - DSc in neuroethology, Australian National University

Career
After completing his PhD in the US, Srinivasan moved to Canberra in 1978 to take up a position at the Departments of Neurobiology and Applied Mathematics at the Australian National University (ANU), where he stayed until 1982, when he secured a research position in Zurich, Switzerland, to work on insect behaviour. It was here that he learnt how to train and work with honeybees. In 1985 he returned to the ANU, and set up an interdisciplinary research group which focused on investigating how bees use their vision to navigate and land very precisely.

In 2007, Srinivisan took up a position working at the Queensland Brain Institute and the School of Information Technology and Electrical Engineering of the University of Queensland.

Srinivasan delivered the 12th Lecture organised by the General K.S. Thimayya Memorial Trust.

Research interests
At Yale, Srinivasan did research on movement perception in flies, and became interested in the vision of insects. 

Focusing his attention on honey bees, in particular the Western honey bee, Srinivasan has explored how simple animal systems display complex behaviours. This broad field has applications in robotics, especially unmanned aerial vehicles because of the competing needs for autonomy and a lightweight control system.

Bees are highly competent fliers. Srinivasan has shown that many ostensibly complex flight behaviours can be attributed to the tendency of the bee to keep optic flow constant. Some examples:
 They measure the distance they have travelled. This is important as distance is signalled to other bees as a component of the waggle dance.
 When landing, the ground becomes closer and therefore appears to be moving faster. By keeping the apparent velocity of the ground constant, the bee reduces its own velocity in a continuous manner.
 Similarly, bees slow down in a crowded landscape because nearby objects appear to move faster than objects on the horizon. This is a safety mechanism that reduces the incidence of collision.
 When avoiding objects, the bee will tend to take the optimal path because it will 'balance' the rate of the optic flow between the eyes. It will, for example, fly down the middle of a tunnel, because if it flew closer to one side the optic flow would appear to be greater.

Srinivasan's research looks mainly at "vision, perception and cognition in animals with simple nervous systems, and on how these might be used in machine vision and robotics".

Awards and honours
Srinivasan's work has been recognised and honoured by a number of awards and honours, including: 
1995 - Election to the Fellowship of the Australian Academy of Science (FAA)
2001 - Inaugural Australian Federation Fellowship award of the Australian Research Council
2001 - Australasian Science Prize (for excellence in peer-reviewed research)
2001 - Election to the Fellowship of the Royal Society of London (FRS)
2003 - Australian Centenary Medal
2006 - Royal Society of New Zealand Distinguished Visitor
2006 - Fellowship of the Academy of Sciences for the Developing World
2008 - Queensland Smart State Premier's Fellowship
2008 - Rank Prize for Optoelectronics (UK)
2009 - Distinguished Alumni Award of the Indian Institute of Science
2012 - Membership of the Order of Australia (AM)

Publications
, Srinivasan had authored 15 book chapters, 189 journal articles, 69 conference papers, and had registered two patents. The patents were registered with co-authors Javaan Singh Chahl  and other researchers: a "novel system for panoramic video surveillance" in 1997, and an imaging system in 2002 (US).

References

Further reading
 The work of Srinivasan's group at the University of Queensland.

1948 births
Living people
Indian Institute of Science alumni
Australian biologists
Fellows of the Royal Society
Members of the Order of Australia
Fellows of the Australian Academy of Science
Bangalore University alumni